Jean Jay Macpherson (June 13, 1931 – March 21, 2012) was a Canadian lyric poet and scholar. The Encyclopædia Britannica calls her "a member of 'the mythopoeic school of poetry,' who expressed serious religious and philosophical themes in symbolic verse that was often lyrical or comic."

Life

Jay Macpherson was born in London, England, in 1931. She was brought to Newfoundland in 1940 as a 'war guest'.

In 1951 Macpherson received a BA from Carleton College (now Carleton University) in 1951, followed by a year at University College in London. She received a BLS from McGill University, and then completed her MA and PhD at Victoria College, University of Toronto, both supervised by professor and critic Northrop Frye.

Macpherson published poetry in Contemporary Verse in 1949. Her first book was published in 1952.

In 1954 Macpherson began her own small press, Emblem Books, which published her second volume, O Earth Return. Between 1954 and 1963, Emblem Books published eight chapbooks featuring the work of Canadian poets, including Dorothy Livesay, Alden Nowlan, and Al Purdy.

Macpherson's two earlier volumes were incorporated into The Boatman (1957), a book which "gained her a considerable reputation. Dedicated to Northrop Frye and his wife, the collection reflects Frye's emphasis on the mythic and archetypal properties of poetry." The Boatman won the Governor General's Award in 1958.

Macpherson taught English at Victoria College from 1957 until 1996. She became a Professor of English in 1974.

Her 1982 book The Spirit of Solitude is "a highly regarded study of the elegiac and pastoral traditions from the 17th century onward."

Jay Macpherson died on Mar 21, 2012.

Writing

Macpherson has been described "as a 'mythopoeic' poet – rooted in the teachings of Frye, the archetypes of Carl Jung, and the intensely conservative social vision of T.S. Eliot." Within her work, "recurring themes involve the creation, fall, flood, redemption and the apocalypse." Her interest is in "authentic myth", "the ones that have some imaginative force behind them."

In technique, Macpherson has been placed "beside Margaret Avison, P. K. Page, Phyllis Webb, but especially Anne Hébert – particularly in the use of the Gothic and macabre themes and devices."

The Boatman

Macpherson's first major work, The Boatman (1957), "describes a world where redemption is still possible."
 Northrop Frye (to whom The Boatman was dedicated) called it the "one good book" of Canadian poetry for that year. He added: "There is little use looking for bad lines or lapses in taste: The Boatman is completely successful within the conventions it adopts, and anyone dissatisfied with the book must quarrel with the conventions. Among these are the use of a great variety of echoes, some of them direct quotations from other poems, and an interest in myth, both Biblical and Classical."

The Boatman of the title "is Noah, but both Noah and the ark itself form an allegory for the artist and the artistic experience, the ark representing Jung's collective unconscious." "The creation is inside its creator, and the ark similarly attempts to explain to Noah ... that it is really inside him, as Eve was once inside Adam:
          When the four quarters shall
          Turn in and make one whole,
          Then I who wall your body,
          Which is to me a soul,

          Shall swim circled by you
          And cradled on your tide,
          Who was not even, not ever,
          Taken from your side.
"As the ark expands into the flooded world, the body of the Biblical leviathan, and the order of nature, the design of the whole book begins to take shape. The Boatman begins with a poem called 'Ordinary People in the Last Days,' a wistful poem about an apocalypse that happens to everyone except the poet, and ends with a vision of a 'Fisherman' who ... catches 'myriad forms,' eats them, drinks the lake they are in, and is caught in his turn by God."

Welcoming Disaster
Macpherson's next major work, Welcoming Disaster (1974), "employs more complex forms to pursue its quest for meaning; the poems frequently succeed in maintaining imaginative contact with social reality while extending Macpherson's essential concern with psychological and metaphysical conditions."

George Woodcock saw Welcoming Disaster and The Boatman as similar, even complementary: "They are narratives of journeys into spiritual day and night, disguised, no doubt, by all the devices of privacy, but nonetheless derived from true inner experiences." Margaret Atwood emphasized their differences: "If The Boatman is 'classical,' . . . then Welcoming Disaster is, by the same lights, 'romantic': more personal, more convoluted, darker and more grotesque, its rhythms more complex"<ref name=keith>W.J. Keith, "Jay Macpherson's Welcoming Disaster: a Reconsideration," Canadian Poetry: Studies/Documents/Reviews," No. 36 (Spring/Summer 1995), UWO, Web, Apr. 12, 2011.</ref>

"Welcoming Disaster, has the critics baffled. They cannot agree on its proper interpretation - is it a darker, more tragic vision or is the possibility of redemption there?" Suniti Namjoshi saw it as a book about redemption: about the necessity "to hit bottom and then to make the journey up"; "after a descent into the underworld ... it is possible to return to the ordinary world of everyday life". David Bromwich, reviewing the book in Poetry, saw it as even more positive: for him, it "moves from consolation to guilt to terror and finally to a deepened consolation." On the other hand, Lorraine Weir interpreted the book to  be saying that the "underworld journey of redemption ... fails".   "Fertility is not restored, the underworld is not left behind." Weir calls Macpherson's vision "inescapably a tragic one."

Recognition

Macpherson won Poetry magazine's Levinson Prize, and the University of Western Ontario President's Medal, in 1957.

She won the Governor General's Award for The Boatman in 1958.

A small park in her former Toronto neighbourhood, Jay Macpherson Green, is named for her near Avenue Road and Dupont Street.

 Publications 

Poetry
 A Country Without a Mythology. n.p.: 195?.
 1952:Nineteen Poems. Mallorca, Spain: Seizin Press
 1954:O Earth Return. Toronto: Emblem Books
 1957:The Fisherman: A Book of Riddles 
 1957:The Boatman. Toronto: Oxford University Press
 1959:A Dry Light & The Dark Air. Toronto: Hawkshead Press
 1968:The Boatman and Other Poems. Toronto: Oxford UP
 1974:Welcoming Disaster: Poems, 1970-74. Toronto: Saannes Publications
 1981:Poems Twice Told: The Boatman & Welcoming Disaster. Toronto: Oxford University Press

Fiction
 1962:The Four Ages of Man: The Classical Myths. Toronto: Macmillan

Non-fiction
 1972:Pratt’s Romantic Mythology: The Witches’ Brew. St. John's Nfld.: Memorial University
 1974:"Beauty and the Beast" and Some Relatives. Toronto: Toronto Public Library
 1982:The Spirit of Solitude: Conventions and Continuities in Late Romance. New Haven: Yale University PressExcept where otherwise noted, bibliographic information courtesy Brock University.References

Monograph

Weir, Lorraine. Jay Macpherson and Her Works Toronto: ECW Press, 1989.

Articles
 Berner, Audrey. "The ‘Unicorn’ Poems of Jay Macpherson." Journal of Canadian Poetry 3 (1980): 9-16.
 "Comments (On the Practice of Alluding)." University of Toronto Quarterly 61.3 (1992): 381-390.
 Keith, W.J. "Jay Macpherson’s Welcoming Disaster: a Reconsideration." Canadian Poetry 36 (1995): 32-43.
 Weir, Lorraine. "Toward a Feminist Hermeneutics: Jay Macpherson's Welcoming Disaster," in Gynocritics/La Gynocritique - Feminist Approaches to Writing by Canadian and Quebecoise Women, ed. Barbara Godard (Toronto: ECW P, 1987) 59-70.
 Namjoshi, Suniti. "In the Whale’s Belly: Jay Macpherson’s Poetry." Canadian Literature 79 (1978): 54-59.
 Reaney, James. "The Third-Eye: Macpherson’s The Boatman." Canadian Literature'' 3 (1960): 23-34.

Notes

External links

 Biography and selected poetry of Jay Macpherson
Jay Macpherson's  entry in The Canadian Encyclopedia

1931 births
2012 deaths
20th-century Canadian poets
Canadian women poets
Alumni of University College London
Anglo-Scots
Canadian people of Scottish descent
Canadian modernist poets
English emigrants to Canada
Governor General's Award-winning poets
McGill University alumni
Members of the United Church of Canada
University of Toronto alumni
Academic staff of the University of Toronto
Writers from London
Writers from Toronto
20th-century Canadian women writers